"Take On the World" is a song by English heavy metal band Judas Priest, originally released on their 1978 album Killing Machine, and released as a single in January 1979. It was the first Judas Priest single to chart in the UK top 40, reaching number 14. The song was an attempt at producing a stadium shoutalong tune in the mould of Queen's "We Will Rock You". It was also covered by new wave band The Human League on their 1980 tour. According to guitarist K.K. Downing, the song was used by Wolverhampton Wanderers football club as their club song. As a single it sold around 400,000 copies.

Personnel
Rob Halford – vocals
Glenn Tipton – lead guitar
K. K. Downing – rhythm guitar
Ian Hill – bass
Les Binks – drums

Charts

References

1978 songs
1979 singles
Judas Priest songs
Songs written by Glenn Tipton
Songs written by Rob Halford
British rock songs
Columbia Records singles